Laura Leticia Garcete Riveros (Asunción, born 1990) is a Paraguayan model and beauty pageant titleholder who was crowned Nuestra Belleza Paraguay 2015 but was dethroned since she got pregnant during her reign.

Personal life
Garcete represented Paraguay at the Miss Yacht International 2012 pageant in China on November 17, 2012, and at the Miss United Continents 2013 pageant in Ecuador on September 13, 2013.

Nuestra Belleza Paraguay 2015
On September 21, 2015, Laura was crowned Nuestra Belleza del Paraguay 2015 in Asuncion. The three runners-up were placed as Miss World Paraguay, Miss International Paraguay and Miss Earth Paraguay. As Nuestra Belleza del Paraguay 2015, Laura was supposed to compete at the Miss Universe 2015 pageant. However, during her reign, she became pregnant and thus was disqualified from the title. Garcete's replacement, and the Miss Universe representative for Paraguay in Miss Universe 2015, was Myriam Arévalos.

Reina Hispanoamericana 2015
On October 24, 2015, Garcete represented her country at the 25th Reina Hispanoamericana pageant, where she placed as the Virreina (2nd Place) of the competition.

References

External links
www.bellezaparaguaya.org

Living people
1990 births
Paraguayan beauty pageant winners
Paraguayan female models